During the 2015–16 campaign they will compete in the Danish Superliga and Danish Cup.

Competitions

Danish Superliga

External links
Official website (in Danish)

Danish football clubs 2015–16 season
Esbjerg fB